St Joseph's Roman Catholic Middle School is one of the two middle schools in Hexham, Northumberland, England, the other being Hexham Middle School. The school is closely associated with St Mary's First School, a first school which is also a Roman Catholic school, and with the local Catholic church, St Mary's

The school, like the high school which its children progress to at the age of 13, and is attended by approximately 330 pupils.

Previously a voluntary aided school and specialist arts college administered by Northumberland County Council, in December 2020 St Joseph's Roman Catholic Middle School converted to academy status. The school is now sponsored by the Bishop Wilkinson Catholic Education Trust.

References

External links
St Joseph's Roman Catholic Middle School official website

Catholic secondary schools in the Diocese of Hexham and Newcastle
Middle schools in Northumberland
Academies in Northumberland